Hierodula werneri is a species of praying mantis in the family Mantidae.

Subspecies
These two subspecies belong to the species Hierodula werneri:
 Hierodula werneri curvidens Werner, 1911
 Hierodula werneri werneri Giglio-Tos, 1912

References

werneri
Articles created by Qbugbot
Insects described in 1912